Ten Brothers is a Chinese legend known to be written around the time of the Ming Dynasty (1368 to 1644). It has been told and spun off in various adaptations and remains popular since it is one of the oldest Chinese legends to feature characters in a superhero fashion.

Story
The more modern version of the story has a couple swallow ten pearls and give birth to ten brothers. Each one of the ten brothers possesses a different supernatural power, though they develop their powers as the story progresses.  At the end, the brothers battle some form of an antagonist and they only win when working in unity.
However, if the ten brothers come into contact with limestone, their powers disappear and they become helpless.

Characters
The number of brothers varies among Chinese ethnicities. The Yi people have nine brothers, the Zhuang people have eight brothers, the Han people have five brothers and the Li people have 10 brothers.

 1st and Oldest Brother - Capable of seeing miles away with his binocular eyes, sometimes identified as Mazu's guardian Qianliyan
 2nd Brother - Capable of hearing miles away, sometimes identified as Mazu's guardian Shunfeng'er
 3rd Brother - Has Herculean strength.
 4th Brother - Has the ability to stretch and is invincible.
 5th Brother - Capable of flying.
 6th Brother - Has a solid impenetrable head and is the smartest.
 7th Brother - Can grow in height.
 8th Brother - Capable of tunneling underground.
 9th Brother - Has a huge mouth that can blow wind and shout loudly.
 10th and Youngest Brother - Can cry a river; also can heal any illnesses if he cries on people.

Adaptations

Film
The story has been adapted many times in Asian movies and TV series, most notably in China and Hong Kong:

The Liu Brothers, 1953 Soviet cartoon
Ten Brothers, 1959 Hong Kong black and white film by director Wui Ng
Ten Brothers vs. the Sea Monster (十兄弟怒海除魔), 1960 film
Ten Brothers, 1985 series by ATV
Ten Brothers, 1995 Hong Kong film by director Lee Lik-Chi
Ten Brothers, 2007 series by TVB

Literary
The Five Chinese Brothers, 1938 American book by Claire Huchet Bishop, illustrated by Kurt Wiese
Seven Chinese Brothers, 1990 children's picture book by Margaret Mahy, illustrated by Jean and Mou-sien Tseng
The Five Queer Brothers. a transcription of a Chinese version by Western missionary Adele M. Fielde

See also
Chinese mythology
Great Ten

References

External links
 Ten Brothers at Library thinkquest

Chinese folklore
Superheroes
Fiction about magic
Fictional Chinese people
Fictional families
Works about brothers